Viveki Rai (19 November 1924 – 22 November 2016) was an Indian writer who penned over fifty books.

He was a famous literary figure of Hindi and Bhojpuri literature. He belonged to Bhumihar Brahmin community of Sonwani village in Ghazipur. He was a well known Hindi Lalit Nibandhakaar. He received numerous awards from the government of Uttar Pradesh.  Sonamati is his most popular novel. He was awarded Mahapandit Rahul Sankrityayan Award in 2001 and Uttar Pradesh's prestigious Yash Bharati Samman award in 2006 for his contribution to Hindi literature. He has been awarded the Mahatma Gandhi Samman by the Uttar Pradesh government. 
Sri Rai has been awarded by Jagadguru Ramanandacharya Award of Srimath Kashi on 14 January 2012 in Varanasi.
He criticized the Indian Emergency through his writing. He also published some notable essays.
After a long illness, Rai died on 22 November 2016.

Early life
Viveki Rai was born in Bharauli village of Ghazipur district in Uttar Pradesh, India. He lost his father when he was a young child. He got his early education at his maternal place. His first employment was as a teacher at his village Sonwani. However, after a couple of years he moved to Sri Sarvodaya Inter College, Khardiha and started teaching Hindi. It was village Khardiha where he got recognition as a writer. After a few years at Khardiha he was employed at post graduate college Ghazipur as lecturer.

List of works

Hindi
 Mangal Bhavan
 Namami Gramama
 Dehri ke
 Circus
 Sona Mati
 Kalatit
 Gunga Jahaj
 Purush Puran
 Samar Shesh Hai
 Fir Baitalawa Dar Par
 Aam Rasta Nahin Hai
 Angan Ke Bandanvar
 Astha Aur Chintan
 Atithi
 Babool
 Chali Fagunhat Baure Aam
 Gamvai Gandh Gulab
 Jivan Agyan Ka Ganith Hai
 Lautkar Dekhna
 Lokrin
 Manbodh Master Ki Diary
 Mere Shuddha Shraddhey
 Meri Terah Kahaniyan
 Narendra Kohli Apratim Katha Yatri
 Sawalon Ke Samne
 Shwet Patra
 Yeh Jo Hai Gayatri

Literary Criticism
 Kalpana Aur Hindi Sahitya, Anila Prakāśana, 1999.

Others
 MERI SHRESHTHA VYANGYA RACHNAYEN, 1984.

Bhojpuri

Essays and Poetry
 Bhojapurī nibandha nikuñja: Bhojapurī ke taintālīsa go cunala nibandha, Akhila Bhāratīya Bhojapurī Sāhitya Sammelana, 1977.
 Gaṅgā, Yamunā, Sarasvatī: Bhojapurī kahānī, nibandha, saṃsmaraṇa, Bhojapurī Saṃsthāna, 1992.
 Janatā ke pokharā: tīni go Bhojapurī kavitā, Bhojapurī Sāhitya Saṃsthāna, 1984.
 Bhojapurī Akādamī, Paṭanā, tisarakā vārshikotsava samāroha, Ravivāra, 2 Maī 1982, ke avasara para āyojita vyākhyānamālā meṃ Bhojapurī kathā sāhitya ke vikāsa vishaya para Ḍô. Vivekī Rāya ... ke vyākhyāna, Bhojapurī Akādamī, 1982.

Stories 

 Chhat ke talas

Novels
 Amangalhari, Bhojpurī Saṃsthāna, 1998.
 Ke Kahala Chunarī Rangā la, Bhojpuri Saṃsāda, 1968.
 Guru-Grih Gayau Padhan Raghurai, 1992.

Ph.D. Dissertations on Viveki Rai
 Viveki Rai Ke Upanyasom Mein Anchalikata-By.Rajeemole C R Mahatma Gandhi University
 Gaav Ke Badalate Swaroop:Viveki Rai Ke Upanyason Ke Visesh Sandarbh Me-By. Daissy Peter, Sree Sankaracharya University of Sanskrit 
 Dr Viveki Rai Vyaktitav Aur Krititav-By D K Bamane, University of Mumbai

See also
 List of Indian writers
 Tapan Kumar Pradhan
 Namdeo Dhasal

Notes

References
 Amaresh Datta, Mohan Lal, Encyclopaedia of Indian Literature : Navaratri-Sarvasena, Sahitya Akademi, 1991.

1924 births
2016 deaths
People from Ghazipur
Hindi-language writers
20th-century Indian novelists
Bhojpuri-language writers
Writers from Uttar Pradesh
Indian literary critics
20th-century Indian essayists
20th-century Indian poets